Statistics of Japan Football League in the 1994 season.

Overview
It was contested by 16 teams, and Cerezo Osaka won the championship. Along with Kashiwa Reysol they were promoted to the J.League.

NEC Yamagata, the future Montedio Yamagata, were promoted to the JFL before the season, having won the Regional Promotion Series.

League standings

References

1996
2
Japan
Japan